Rajamala is a hill station in Eravikulam National park located about 15 kilometers from Munnar, Kerala, India. It is 2000 meters above sea level.

References

Hill stations in Kerala
Populated places in the Western Ghats
Villages in Idukki district
Munnar